Tang Tian may refer to:

 Tang Tian (footballer) – (born 1977), Chinese footballer and coach
 Tang Tian (songwriter) – (born 1983), Chinese songwriter